Yao Chen (born 5 October 1979) is a Chinese actress and philanthropist. In 2014, Time named Yao as one of the most influential people on their Time 100 list. As of 2014, she is listed as the 83rd most powerful woman in the world by Forbes. Several English-language media outlets have nicknamed her "China's answer to Angelina Jolie."

Yao ranked 56th on Forbes China Celebrity 100 list in 2013, 69th in 2014, 41st in 2015, and 60th in 2019.

Personal life
Yao was born in Shishi City, Quanzhou, Fujian province on 5 October 1979 to a middle-class family, and studied Chinese folk dance at the Beijing Dance Academy from 1993 to 1997, then studied at the Beijing Film Academy from 1999 to 2003.

In 2004, Yao married Chinese actor Ling Xiaosu, but they divorced in January 2011. Yao married cinematographer Cao Yu in November 2012. She gave birth to their first child in 2013.

Career
Yao starred as the daughter of a powerful martial artist in a 2005 television production of My Own Swordsman. The series was especially popular and skyrocketed her to fame in China. Following this, in 2008, she played the part of an iconic guerilla leader in the series Lurk. The spy drama became a smash hit in China and Yao won the Best Actress award at the Huading Awards and the Golden Eagle Awards.

In 2009, she made her theatrical debut; playing a white-collar heroine in A Story of Lala's Promotion. She also had a supporting role in the romantic comedy Sophie's Revenge starring Zhang Ziyi. In a departure from her usual style, Yao's portrayal of a money-grabbing woman received acclaim from the audience. Yao then starred in romantic comedy Color Me Love (2010) as an aspiring fashion magazine editor, which would go on to become one of her most famous film roles.

In 2012, Yao starred in Chen Kaige's social drama Caught in the Web as a truth-seeking journalist. She then starred alongside Andy Lau in the action thriller Firestorm, which won her the Outstanding Actress award at the Chinese Film Media Awards.

Yao played a lawyer in the 2014 drama Divorce Lawyers. The drama was a huge success in China and sparked discussions online about emotion, truth, and law.

Most recently, Yao starred in blockbusters Monster Hunt (2015), Chronicles of the Ghostly Tribe (2015) and Journey to the West 2 (2017). Yao was nominated as Best Supporting Actress at the Hundred Flowers Awards for her performance in Monster Hunt. She also starred in MBA Partners (2016), playing an ambitious young woman.

In 2017, Yao served as the jury of the 23rd Shanghai Television Festival.

In 2018, Yao starred in the mystery film Lost, Found alongside Ma Yili; a remake of the South Korean film Missing.

In 2019, Yao starred in the family drama All Is Well. The series was extremely popular during its run, and Yao experienced a resurgence in popularity.

Activism
Yao was named the UNHCR's Honorary Patron for China and has visited refugees in places including the Philippines, Thailand, Somalia, Sudan and Ethiopia. The number of followers of her microblogging during this visit increased dramatically, won over by her sincere, fearless communication and her honest engagement with current world events. In 2013, she was named the first UNHCR goodwill ambassador in China.

Yao is among the people most followed on Weibo with 79 million followers. She uses her influence and wide reach to spread awareness on issues such as refugees crisis, pollution and censorship. 
 
Yao was among the recipients of the 2016 Crystal Award for her work on behalf of the U.N. refugee agency in raising awareness of the world refugee crisis. The same year, she was selected as one of the "Young Global Leaders" in 2016 by the World Economic Forum. Yao was also awarded the Top Influence Award at the You Bring Charm to the World award ceremony.

Filmography

Film

Television series

Discography

Awards and nominations

References

External links 
 Yao Chen's official Weibo (Chinese)
 

1979 births
Living people
Actresses from Fujian
Chinese television actresses
21st-century Chinese actresses
Chinese stage actresses
Beijing Film Academy alumni
Chinese film actresses
People from Shishi, Fujian
Chinese Christians